Sendhil Amithab Ramamurthy (born May 17, 1974) is an American actor. A native of San Antonio, Texas, Ramamurthy is best known for his roles as geneticist Mohinder Suresh in the NBC sci-fi drama Heroes, Gabriel "Gabe" Lowan in Beauty and the Beast, and Jai Wilcox in Covert Affairs.

Early life and education
Ramamurthy was born in Chicago to a Hindu family who emigrated from India; his father is a Kannadiga and his mother is a Tamil from the Pillai community. He grew up speaking English and some Kannada. His parents are physicians. He has one sister who is also a physician. He and his sister were raised in San Antonio. There, he went to Keystone School and graduated in 1991.

Ramamurthy attended Tufts University initially as a pre-med major to follow in his parents' footsteps. He was also a member of the Kappa Charge of Theta Delta Chi. He became interested in acting when he took an "Intro to Acting" class during his junior year as part of his graduation requirement. After participating in several plays, including Our Country's Good, he chose to change career goals. He graduated with a bachelor's degree in history and then attended the Webber Douglas Academy of Dramatic Art in London in 1996, graduating in 1998.

Career
Ramamurthy has appeared in theatrical productions of A Servant of Two Masters in London's West End, Indian Ink at the Soho Repertory Theatre, and East Is East at the Manhattan Theatre Club. His film credits include Love & Debate (originally titled Thanks to Gravity), Orient Express, Blind Dating, Little India, Shor in the City and Gurinder Chadha's comedy film It's a Wonderful Afterlife. In addition, he has appeared on several TV shows, including Ellen, Casualty, Guiding Light, Grey's Anatomy, Ultimate Force, CSI: Miami, Heroes, Covert Affairs and Numb3rs.

He made a conscious decision to not audition for stereotypical Indian roles, although he has been offered such parts. Ramamurthy's role on Heroes was his biggest to date. Although the character of Mohinder Suresh was originally written for a 55-year-old, his audition tape and screen test were convincing enough for writers to rewrite the part for Ramamurthy. Ramamurthy starred in all four seasons of Heroes, although his appearance in the final season was limited; had the series been recommissioned for a fifth season, he would not have returned for it.

In 2000, he appeared in NBC's television biblical miniseries In the Beginning in the role of Adam.

Ramamurthy guest starred in a season four episode of Psych titled "Bollywood Homicide", directed by his cousin Jay Chandrasekhar.

Ramamurthy joined the cast of the USA Network show Covert Affairs as Jai Wilcox from the second episode onward, replacing character Conrad Sheehan III, played by Eric Lively in the pilot. The show premiered in July 2010. In the season 3 premiere, his character was killed off.

Ramamurthy appeared in the eighth and ninth season of The Office as Kelly Kapoor's new boyfriend, Ravi.

On December 19, 2012, it was announced that he would appear in the CW show Beauty & the Beast as Gabriel Lowen, an assistant district attorney.

He appeared in his Heroes role in that series's continuation entitled Heroes Reborn, in 2015 and 2016.

He appeared as Dr. Ramsey Rosso/Bloodwork in the sixth season of the television series The Flash.

As of 2020, he is part of the cast of the new Netflix series Never Have I Ever, playing Mohan Vishwakumar, the main character's father. The series is produced by Mindy Kaling, who had first worked with Ramamurthy when she was a writer and actor on The Office.

In 2022, Ramamurthy appeared in season four of Doom Patrol as Mister 104.

Personal life
In 1999, Ramamurthy married actress Olga Sosnovska. They have two children, daughter Halina and son Alek, born in 2005 and 2008 respectively. He and his family previously lived in London and have since moved to New York.

Comedian and film director Jay Chandrasekhar is his cousin. He is a sustaining member of WNYC.

Filmography

Film

Television

References

External links
 Sendhil Ramamurthy's Official Website
 

1974 births
Living people
Male actors from Chicago
American people of Kannada descent
American people of Indian Tamil descent
Alumni of the Webber Douglas Academy of Dramatic Art
American Hindus
Male actors from San Antonio
Male actors from Texas
Tufts University School of Arts and Sciences alumni
Male actors from New Rochelle, New York
American male actors of Indian descent
American male television actors
American male film actors
21st-century American male actors
American emigrants to the United Kingdom
American male voice actors